Baker Airport may refer to:

 Baker Airport in Baker, California, US (FAA: 0O2)
 Baker Municipal Airport in Baker, Montana, US (FAA/IATA: BHK)
 Baker City Municipal Airport in Baker City, Oregon, US (FAA: BKE)